Orest Michael Kindrachuk (born September 14, 1950) is a Canadian-American former professional ice hockey centre who played ten seasons in the National Hockey League (NHL) for the Philadelphia Flyers, Pittsburgh Penguins, and Washington Capitals.

Early life
Born in Nanton, Alberta, Canada, his parents were Ukrainian immigrants and his first language was Ukrainian. Kindrachuk played his junior hockey for the Saskatoon Blades.

Career 
Kindrachuk was not drafted and instead joined the San Diego Gulls after signing as a free agent by the Philadelphia Flyers in July 1971. He made his NHL debut in the 1972–73 season, and joined the Flyers full-time in the 1973–74 season.

Kindrachuk became an important part of the Flyers team as he helped them to win Stanley Cups as a rookie in 1974 as well as 1975. "Little O" Kindrachuk spent much of his time in Philadelphia centering Dave "The Hammer" Schultz and Don "Big Bird" Saleski on the team's third line. He played for the Flyers for six seasons.

Kindrachuk was traded to the Pittsburgh Penguins prior to the 1978–79 NHL season, where he played for three seasons as the team's captain. He signed with the Washington Capitals in 1981, but played only four games before he was forced to retire due to injuries.

After hockey, Kindrachuk went into the insurance and packaging industry in the Philadelphia area. In August 2012, he became a U.S. citizen.

Career statistics

References

External links
 
Orest Kindrachuk's biography at Greatest Hockey Legends

1950 births
Canadian ice hockey centres
Ice hockey people from Alberta
Living people
Canadian people of Ukrainian descent
Philadelphia Flyers players
Pittsburgh Penguins players
Richmond Robins players
San Diego Gulls (WHL) players
Saskatoon Blades players
Stanley Cup champions
Undrafted National Hockey League players
Washington Capitals players